A. pedestris may refer to:
 Acantholycosa pedestris, a wolf spider species found in Europe
 Antaxius pedestris, a cricket species
 Acanthaspis pedestris, an assassin bug species